Edna Solodar (born 15 March 1930) is an Israeli former politician who served as a member of the Knesset for the Alignment and Labor Party between 1982 and 1992.

Biography
Born in Ashdot Ya'akov during the Mandate era, Solodar later moved to kibbutz Gesher. She was educated at the kibbutz's high school and went on to attend the Rubin Academy of Music in Tel Aviv, as well as studying humanities and social sciences at Efal.

She worked as a music teacher in kibbutzim, Beit She'an and the Jordan Valley. From 1967 until 1971 and again from 1978 until 1980, she was secretary of kibbutz Gesher, and also served as the Internal Affairs secretary of the Kibbutz HaMeuhad movement between 1972 and 1982.

For the 1981 Knesset elections she was placed on the Alignment list. Although she failed to win a seat, she entered the Knesset on 16 January the following year as a replacement for Moshe Harif, another kibbutz activist who had been killed in a traffic collision. She was re-elected in 1984 and 1988, but lost her seat in the 1992 elections.

Between 1992 and 1998 she served as chairwoman of the United Kibbutz Movement.

References

External links

1930 births
Kibbutzniks
People from Northern District (Israel)
Jews in Mandatory Palestine
Israeli educators
Israeli women educators
Living people
Women members of the Knesset
Alignment (Israel) politicians
Israeli Labor Party politicians
Members of the 10th Knesset (1981–1984)
Members of the 11th Knesset (1984–1988)
Members of the 12th Knesset (1988–1992)
20th-century Israeli women politicians